Anton Andreyevich Betyuzhnov (born 8 May 1997) is a Russian football player. He plays for FC Znamya Truda Orekhovo-Zuyevo.

Club career
He made his debut in the Russian Football National League for FC Shinnik Yaroslavl on 15 May 2016 in a game against FC Sibir Novosibirsk.

References

External links
 Profile by Russian Football National League
 

1997 births
Footballers from Yaroslavl
Living people
Russian footballers
Association football midfielders
FC Shinnik Yaroslavl players
FC Znamya Truda Orekhovo-Zuyevo players
Russian First League players
Russian Second League players